Lucyna Emilia Wiśniewska (30 June 1955 – 30 October 2022) was a Polish politician. She was elected to the Sejm on 25 September 2005, getting 10,846 votes in 17 Radom district as a candidate from the Law and Justice list.

On 27 April 2007, she changed her political affiliation and joined the Right Wing of the Republic party.

Wiśniewska died in a car accident on 30 October 2022, at the age of 67.

See also
Members of Polish Sejm 2005-2007

References

External links
Lucyna Wiśniewska - parliamentary page - includes declarations of interest, voting record, and transcripts of speeches.

1955 births
2022 deaths
People from Radom County
Members of the Polish Sejm 2005–2007
Women members of the Sejm of the Republic of Poland
Law and Justice politicians
Right Wing of the Republic politicians
21st-century Polish women politicians
Road incident deaths in Poland